Morus mongolica, also described as Morus alba var. mongolica, is a woody plant native to mountain forests in Mongolia, China, Korea, and Japan. Common names include Mongolian mulberry, meng sang (China), and ilama by native people in the namesake region of Mongolia. Similar to M. notabilis, M. mongolica is an uncultivated (wild, undomesticated) mulberry.

Description 
Morus mongolica is a perennial woody tree.

The tree blooms from March to April and fruits in April to May.

The fruits are aggregate, and are dull red to black in color.  Each cluster is about 1–3 cm long with a 1 cm diameter, while the individual drupelets are about 3 mm in diameter.

Chemistry 
Morus mongolica is known to have multiple flavonoid and phenolic compounds. These compounds can be found in the fruits, leaves, and bark.

Distribution 
Its native range is the mountains of Mongolia, China, Korea, and Japan.

Ecology 
The leaves are eaten and digested by silkworms and the proteins are used by the silkworms for the production of cocoon silk.

Uses 
The fruits have been recorded as being consumed by Mongol herdsmen.

The wood of the has been suggested to be of possible use for biofuel, among other soft wood trees.

See also 
Morus (plant)
Morus alba
Flora of China

References

Further reading 
https://species.wikimedia.org/wiki/Morus_mongolica
http://www.theplantlist.org/tpl/record/tro-50064861

Morus (plant)
Medicinal plants
Berries